The Big West Conference Men's Basketball Player of the Year is an annual basketball award given to the Big West Conference's most outstanding player. The conference was formed in 1969 and known as the Pacific Coast Athletic Association until 1988. The award was first given following the 1969–70 season. No player has won the award three times, but there have been eight two-time players of the year. Larry Johnson of UNLV was also the national player of the year in 1990–91, the same season of his second consecutive Big West Player of the Year accolade.

Long Beach State has had the most all-time winners with 13. There have been three ties in the award's history, most recently in 2007–08. Among present Big West members, four schools have had no winners: established members Cal Poly and UC Riverside and 2020 arrivals Cal State Bakersfield and UC San Diego.

Key

Winners

Winners by school

Footnotes
 UNLV left in 1996 to join the Western Athletic Conference (WAC), and is now in the Mountain West Conference (MW).
 Pacific left for the West Coast Conference in 2013.
 UC Santa Barbara joined the conference when it was founded in 1969, left to become an independent after the 1973–74 season, then rejoined in 1976.
 Utah State left in 2005 to join the WAC, and is now in the MW.
 San Diego State left in 1978 to join the WAC, and is now in the MW. 
 Boise State left in 2001 to join the WAC, and is now in the MW.
 Nevada left in 2000 to join the WAC, and is now in the MW.

References 

NCAA Division I men's basketball conference players of the year
Player
Awards established in 1970